Okna may refer to:

Places
Okna (Česká Lípa District), a municipality and village in the Czech Republic
Okna, Kuyavian-Pomeranian Voivodeship, a village in Poland

Other
Okna (TV series), Russian television tabloid talk show